General elections were held in Mexico on 1 July 1934. The presidential elections were won by Lázaro Cárdenas, who received 98.2% of the vote.

Results

President

References

Presidential elections in Mexico
Mexico
General
July 1934 events
Election and referendum articles with incomplete results